The Kampala YMCA is located in Wandegeya, Kampala, Uganda. The building dates from 1962, and houses the non-denominational YMCA Comprehensive Institute, for vocational training. The basement is the Kampala Music School, independent of the YMCA, which trains for ABRSM examinations. A new Educational Complex, next to the original building, is part of the Institute.

It is affiliated to the Uganda YMCA, which also has branches in Jinja, Mukono, Mbale, Mbarara, Kasese.

The organisation divides as Education, Programme (leisure clubs and Gala), Gender (AIDS awareness etc.), and Administration. The Education side covers

 Marketing
 Business management
 Accountancy
 Tourism
 Nursery teaching
 Catering
 Tailoring and designing
 Ugandan business certificate
 Secretarial
 Computer studies 
 Clearing and forwarding
 Counselling
 Business administration
 Cosmetology

The grounds also include a nursery school, administered as part of the Institute, and sports facilities.

References
Y-Voice Magazine, 2005

External links
 Page on Uganda YMCA website
 Official YMCA Kampala website

Education in Uganda
Organisations based in Kampala
1962 establishments in Uganda
YMCA